Saint Selaphiel the Archangel or Saint Sealtiel, Selatiel, or Selathiel (Hebrew: שְׁאַלְתִּיאֵל Šəʾaltīʾēl, Tiberian: Šăʾaltīʾēl, "I have asked God") is one of the archangels in Byzantine Catholic and Eastern Orthodox traditions.

Biblical References
Selaphiel appears in verse 31:6 of the apocryphal Christian text The Conflict of Adam and Eve, which describes how God sends him and Suriyel to help rescue Adam and Eve from Satan’s deception, commanding Selaphiel “to bring them down from the top of the high mountain and to take them to the Cave of Treasures.”

He was given much incense to offer, with the prayers of all God’s people, on the golden altar in front of the throne. The smoke of the incense, together with the prayers of God’s people, went up before God from the angel’s hand."

Patronage
Selaphiel is often seen as the Patron Saint of prayer and worship for members of the Eastern Orthodox Church and some Catholic traditions. In some Orthodox traditions, he is said to help people interpret dreams, break addictions, protect children, preside over exorcisms, and rule over music in heaven. Orthodox Christians will seek his help if their prayer is suffering from distractions, inattentiveness, or coldness. In Catholic tradition, he is depicted with a thurible.

Prayers

A prayer often said in Orthodox and Catholic traditions is the simple St. Selaphiel Prayer for Intercession:

O Pure and Holy Archangel St. Selaphiel (Sealtiel), thou dost bow before the Almighty Lord offering angelic salutations of praise and thanksgiving. Guide us in our prayer. Like thee, we would like to unceasingly pray and worship God in the right way. May our lives be like incense pleasing to God. While awaiting for the inevitable time of separation from this material world, may we praise the Holy Trinity in the spirit of true love and humility throughout the days of our lives in eternity. Obtain for us these favors (name them) and present to God the Father all these petitions through Jesus Christ our Lord, together with the Holy Spirit, forever and ever. 
Amen.

Iconography

When depicted in iconography by himself or with individual characteristics, he is shown in an attitude of humble prayer, with downcast eyes and arms crossed over his breast. He is also sometimes seen kneeling with incense in a thurible, praying. Prayer is considered his special attribute.

See also
 List of angels in theology

References

Archangels
Archangels in Christianity
Angels in Christianity
Individual angels
Eastern Catholic saints
Eastern Orthodox saints
People celebrated in the Lutheran liturgical calendar